Sophie Marie Jeanne Nowicki,  is a physical scientist at the Nasa Goddard Space Flight Centre. She led work investigating ice sheet changes and is Deputy Chief for the Cryospheric Sciences Laboratory where she researches ice sheet dynamics and leads the Interdisciplinary Science Team.

Background and Education 
Sophie was born in northern France to a French mother and American father, both of whom were environmental scientists. Despite originally wanting to be an artist or architect, her parents encouraged her to pursue science. 

Following a BSc in Geophysics at the University of Edinburgh, Nowicki completed an MSc in Remote Sensing and Image Processing, where her Master's thesis was supervised by Chris Merchant. Her PhD thesis, entitled 'Modelling the transition zone of marine ice sheets' was completed in the Centre for Polar Observation and Modelling at University College London (UCL), under the supervision of Duncan Wingham. She remained at UCL for a postdoctoral position before moving to NASA.

Career 
Nowicki has been a research scientist at NASA Goddard since 2009. She was Principal Investigator on a National Science Foundation project investigating Ocean-Ice Interaction in the Amundsen Sea, which concluded in 2011.

Nowicki is Deputy Chief for the Cryospheric Sciences Laboratory and co-leader of the steering committee for the Ice Sheet Model Intercomparison Project for CMIP6. She is the official responsible for the Cryosphere Model Comparison Tool. During her time at NASA she has worked in Operation IceBridge, and co-led the international SeaRISE (Sea-Level Response to Ice Sheet Evolution) project looking at the sensitivity of ice sheets to external environmental forcings. She is a member of the Community Earth System Model (CESM) Scientific Steering Committee (SSC) and an executive committee member for the Ice Sheet Mass Balance Intercomparison Exercise phase 2 (IMBIE2).

Her work often attracts media attention because of her investigations into and comments on climate change. She has spoken to news groups including Yahoo News and Florida Weekly and recorded a NASA Google+ Hangout on sea level rise.

She credits climate scientist Gavin Schmidt as her unofficial mentor.

References

Women space scientists
French women scientists
Year of birth missing (living people)
Living people
French people of American descent
Alumni of the University of Edinburgh
Alumni of University College London
NASA people